is a 1988 third-person shoot 'em up arcade game by Konami.

Plot 
Set in 1989, the player takes control of a mercenary duo known as the "Devastators", who are hired by a small undeveloped country to defend their land from a fanatical Middle East dictator threatening to conquer it.

Gameplay 
The game is essentially a vertical behind-the-back shooter that moves forward only. The soldier walks straight into the scenery, with a perspective similar to the "3D view" stages of Konami's own Contra (1987) as well as Cabal (1988). What set Devastators apart is that instead of advancing automatically, screen by screen, the player walks forward by holding the Up direction, as the background slowly scales toward the screen. Devastators also featured various obstacles that could be used to take cover from enemy fire, as well as two-player cooperative gameplay.

Most of the missions require the player to kill as many enemies as possible for survival. The missions take place in jungles, desert and sea levels. At the end of each mission was a boss. Mainly the weapons were fairly authentic; the soldier was essentially armed with a machine gun and grenades. He can pick up rocket launchers along the way which could be used against heavy armored vehicles. Additionally, the player(s) have a limited amount of time to complete each stage, otherwise the game will end automatically.

Reception 
In Japan, Game Machine listed Devastators on their November 1, 1988 issue as being the third most-successful table arcade unit of the month.

References

External links 

1988 video games
Arcade video games
Arcade-only video games
Cabal shooters
Konami games
Third-person shooters
Video games set in 1989
Konami arcade games
Video games developed in Japan